Nicole Melichar and Květa Peschke were the defending champions, but Peschke chose not to participate. Nicole Melichar played alongside Xu Yifan, but they lost in the first round to Christina McHale and Yanina Wickmayer.

Shuko Aoyama and Ena Shibahara won the title, defeating Nao Hibino and Miyu Kato in the final, 6–3, 7–5. This was Shibahara's first WTA tour level doubles title.

Seeds

Draw

Draw

References

External links
Main Draw

Tianjin Open - Doubles
Tianjin Open